Aneesh Varma is a London-based serial entrepreneur, inventor and angel investor. He is best known as the founder of Aire - a fintech company that built a new process to a simplify credit decisions for consumers. He previously co-founded FabriQate, which went on to be an HSBC Startup Star 2008 & 2009, LDA KC Award 2009, British Council YCE in 2009 and CF500 in 2010. He was featured on the Business Insider 35 under 35 Fintech list in 2018

Varma has been a vocal campaigner for financial inclusion. He was educated at Lehigh University, USA studying Engineering and a second degree in Quantitative Finance. He was recognised by the European Commission as one of 12 Entrepreneur of the Year nominees in 2014 and by the British Council as a Young Entrepreneur 2009 in the technology sector. In 2020 he was named the Technology Innovator of the Year in the Credit Sector

Life 
At age 15, Varma achieved a perfect score on the Cambridge University course for Advanced Mathematics. He continued his mathematical focus at university, completing the entire PhD coursework during his bachelor's degree.

Varma is a Lehigh University Martindale Scholar from 2005, publishing his research on Hungary's transition to a market-based Financial System.

Career 

Varma started his first business at 16 and was involved with startups in his university days. At age 21 he was hired into JPMorgan in New York working on transactions for Financial Technology industry including Visa, Synovus and other consumer finance lenders. He has since built 3 technology companies in the United Kingdom that have scaled overseas including accolades for their work in improving financial inclusion. 

Varma also serves on the Lehigh University Alumni Association (LUAA) board amongst other non-profit commitments.

References 

1984 births
Living people
British businesspeople
Angel investors
JPMorgan Chase employees
Lehigh University alumni